The rufous-bellied triller (Lalage aurea) is a species of bird in the family Campephagidae.
It is endemic to the Maluku Islands of Indonesia. Its natural habitats are subtropical or tropical moist lowland forests and subtropical or tropical mangrove forests.

References

rufous-bellied triller
Birds of the Maluku Islands
rufous-bellied triller
Taxonomy articles created by Polbot